Hideki Hashigami (橋上 秀樹, born November 4, 1965) is a former Nippon Professional Baseball outfielder.

External links

1965 births
Living people
Japanese baseball players
Nippon Professional Baseball outfielders
Yakult Swallows players
Nippon Ham Fighters players
Hanshin Tigers players
Nippon Professional Baseball coaches
Managers of baseball teams in Japan
Baseball people from Chiba Prefecture